The Swedish Air Force ( or just ) is the air force branch of the Swedish Armed Forces.

History

The Swedish Air Force was created on 1 July 1926 when the aircraft units of the Army and Navy were merged. Because of the escalating international tension during the 1930s the Air Force was reorganized and expanded from four to seven squadrons.

World War II 
When World War II broke out in 1939 further expansion was initiated and this substantial expansion was not finished until the end of the war. Although Sweden never entered the war, a large air force was considered necessary to ward off the threat of invasion and to resist pressure through military threats from the great powers. By 1945 the Swedish Air Force had over 800 combat-ready aircraft, including 15 fighter divisions.

A major problem for the Swedish Air Force during World War II was the lack of fuel. Sweden was surrounded by countries at war and could not rely on imported oil. Instead domestic oil shales were heated to produce the needed petrol.

About 250 aircrew were killed in crashes 1939-1945 according to statistics that were not disclosed during the war years but published afterwards.

Expansion during the Cold War

The Swedish Air Force underwent a rapid modernization from 1945. It was no longer politically acceptable to equip it with second-rate models. Instead, the Air Staff purchased the best it could find from abroad, e.g. P-51D Mustangs, De Havilland Mosquito NF.19 night fighters and de Havilland Vampires, and supported the development of top performance domestic models. The Saab 29 Tunnan jet fighter was introduced around 1950.

In the late 1950s the Swedish Air Force introduced the Bas 60 air base system, which revolved around force dispersal of air squadrons across many wartime air bases in case of war in order to make it complicated for an opponent to destroy the air force on the ground. Road runways were also introduced as backup runways. Bas 60 was developed further into Bas 90 during the 1970s and 1980s.

During the Cold War large amounts of money (including funds intended for the Swedish nuclear weapons programme) were spent on the Swedish Air Force and domestic aircraft production. In 1957 Sweden had the world's fourth most powerful air force, with about 1,000 modern planes in front-line service. During the 1950s, it introduced fighters such as the Saab J 29 Tunnan, Saab A 32 Lansen and Saab J 35 Draken.

In June 1952 the Swedish Air Force lost two aircraft on Cold War operations, in what became known as the Catalina affair. A signals intelligence Douglas DC-3 was intercepted by Soviet MiG-15s over the Baltic, and shot down with the loss of three aircrew and five civilian technicians. A PBY Catalina rescue seaplane was then also downed, the five-man crew being rescued from the sea by a freighter.

In the air defence role the Swedish Air Force also operated surface-to-air missiles. Svea Air Corps (F 8) operated de Havilland J-28B Vampire jet aircraft in 1949 being replaced in 1953 by Saab J-29 Tunnan and in 1957 by J-34 Hunter fighters. As of 1961 F 8 reroled into missile defence role becoming the air force technical training centre for using the new RB-68 Bloodhound systems in 2 squadrons until 1974.

These Swedish units also operated the RB-68 missile system (1 squadron each):
Scania Wing, also F 10 Ängelholm
Kalmar Wing, also F 12 Kalmar,
Bråvalla Wing, also F 13 Norrköping
Blekinge Wing, also F 17 Kallinge,

Death toll during the Cold War 
In the Cold War era, more than 600 Swedish fighter pilots were killed in crashes during peacetime exercises and training in the 1945–1991 period. In the 1950s–60s era the flight training curriculum was deficient and the training regimes were too risky and some aircraft types had design flaws. In the 1950s, about 21 pilots were killed annually.

In the 1960s the average number of killed were 13 per year, which meant Sweden had sixfold mortality rate per 100,000 flight hours compared to the United States. In the 1960s flight safety starts to become a consideration, not due to the death toll but because the aircraft were getting increasingly expensive. In October 1960, a Lansen fighter crashed into a farmhouse and killed 7 people. In the 1970s the death toll was reduced to 6–7 per year. In subsequent years, it continued to fall and from 1996 onwards, no fatal accident has been recorded.

War service
The Swedish Air Force has been involved in three wars, the Finno-Soviet Winter War in 1939–40, in which volunteers took part, the Congo Crisis, 1961–64, and in the 2011 Libyan civil war.

Finland 1940
When the Soviet Union attacked Finland in November 1939, Sweden came to its neighbour's assistance and eventually decided not to join the war.

A Swedish volunteer infantry brigade and a volunteer air squadron fought in northern Finland from January to March 1940. The squadron was designated F 19 and consisted of 12 Gloster Gladiator fighters and four Hawker Hart dive-bombers.

Congo 1961–1964

The Swedish Air Force saw combat as part of the United Nations peace-keeping mission ONUC during the Congo Crisis in 1961 to 1964. It established a separate air wing, F 22, equipped with a dozen Saab 29 Tunnans, which performed well under the rough conditions in central Africa. The secessionist adversaries possessed only a small number of aircraft with poor combat capabilities, e.g. Fouga Magister trainers.

1990s – restructuring

With the end of the Cold War the Swedish Armed Forces underwent a massive restructuring process. During this time, several air bases were deemed unnecessary and closed with fighters like the Saab 37 Viggen retired prematurely. In 1994 the air force had over 400 fighters, by 2005 the number had sunk to fewer than 150.

Libya 2011
On 29 March 2011, the Swedish prime minister announced that eight Saab JAS 39 Gripens would support the UN-mandated no-fly zone over Libya. The announcement responded to a NATO request for assistance. The Swedish fighters were limited to supporting the no-fly zone and were not authorized to engage in ground attack sorties. The deployment was approved by the Swedish Riksdag on 1 April 2011 and the first jets departed for Libya on 2 April. A C-130 Hercules accompanied the fighters for mid-air refueling.

Current Inventory

Aircraft

 

Note: Three C-17 Globemaster III's are available through the Heavy Airlift Wing based in Hungary

In November 2022 the Strategic Defense Plan was published in which it was announced that all NH90 helicopters will be phased out and replaced, additional Sikorsky Black Hawks will be ordered for the tactical transport role, a new medium sized helicopter for the ASW/ASuW role will be selected.

Weapons

Organization

Fighter units
There are four wings of fighters:
 Skaraborg Wing (F 7)
 Located at Såtenäs outside Lidköping, operates JAS 39C/D. 
 Blekinge Wing (F 17)
 Located at Kallinge in Ronneby, operates JAS 39C/D.
 Norrbotten Wing (F 21)
 Located at Kallax in Luleå, operates JAS 39C/D.
 Uppland Wing (F 16)
 Located at Ärna airport in Uppsala. Reestablished in 2021

Helicopter units
The aviation units that were formerly under the Swedish Army ("") and the Swedish Navy ("") have been merged with the helicopter units of the Air Force to form the single Helicopter Wing for the entire Armed Forces. The wing has been placed under the authority of the Air Force and consists of:
 1st Helicopter Squadron (abbreviated )
 Kallax in Luleå (co-located with F 21), operates Hkp 14.
 2nd Helicopter Squadron (abbreviated )
 Malmen in Linköping, operates Hkp 15 and Hkp 16.
 3rd Helicopter Squadron (abbreviated )
 Kallinge in Ronneby (co-located with F 17), operates Hkp 14 and Hkp 15.

Air transport and special units 
The air transport units perform airlift operations, and are used in both national and in international missions. The unit also organizes the Swedish part of the Heavy Airlift Wing in Hungary. Signals reconnaissance units conduct electronic combat reconnaissance and intelligence gathering.

 71st Air Transport Division ( abbreviated )
 Co-located with F 7
 7th Transport and Special Air Unit (abbreviated )
 Co-located with F 7

Future of the Swedish Air Force

The Swedish Air Force is being adapted to new future tasks. With the collapse of the only military threat, the Soviet Union, and the end of the Cold War, the Swedish government has cut the Swedish armed forces budget, including the Air Force and its fighters. Today about 80 Gripen C/D fighters remain in service. Some orders have been made on the helicopter side and about 40 new units will join the air force in the coming years. Saab has also joined the primarily French project for the unmanned future stealth plane Dassault nEUROn.

In 2008 and 2010, the Swedish armed forces wanted to retire even more fighters and close air bases to relocate money to other branches. However, because of negative response from the public and pressure from the Swedish government, no cuts happened as of 2011.

Defense Minister Sten Tolgfors responded to the Russian purchase of Mistral-class amphibious assault ships by saying that the Swedish Air Force would need "sea targeting capabilities".

In 2013, the USMC introduced Swedish helicopter units to the forward air control airborne mission profile for better air-ground coordination. In the same year, 60 further modified E class Gripens were ordered with the first plane to join the Air force in 2018. In April 2014, the Swedish government proposed another 10 fighters making the total order 70 planes.

By 2019 there were also plans to keep some of the Gripen C aircraft in service to keep numbers of fighters at current levels.

At RIAT 2022, the commander of the Swedish Air Force stated that the air force in the future (2030) will consist of 60 Jas 39C/D and 60 Jas 39E in a total of 7 fighter squadrons.

Saab JAS 39 Gripen E 
Today the Swedish Air Force main fighter is the Saab JAS 39 Gripen, in the C/D versions. By 2018 95 fighters were active with about 30 of these being updated from the A version.

The heavily modernised E version will replace the current fleet of Gripen Cs. The new aircraft includes a new Active Electronically Scanned Array (AESA) radar, and is powered by the General Electric F414G. It carries more fuel and weapons. The upgrade also includes new weapon systems like the Meteor missile system. In 2013, Saab signed an agreement with the Swedish Defence Materiel Administration for 60 new Gripen in the E version. The first aircraft is to join the Swedish Air Force by 2018. There are also plans to buy further 10 aircraft. JAS 39C is expected to remain in service until 2030.

Military transport aircraft 

The Swedish C-130 Hercules (TP 84) were bought from the United States in the 1960s and has been updated several times. By 2020 the current version will not be able to fly because of new restrictions to civilian air space. The Swedish Defence Materiel Administration has been tasked to update the aircraft so they can remain in service to 2030. There are also plans to buy new aircraft by 2024 to replace the current fleet. As part of the Heavy Airlift Wing cooperation, Sweden also operates three Boeing C-17 which are located at Pápa Air Base in Hungary.

Training aircraft 
Sweden uses the Saab 105 as the primary jet-trainer. About 40 planes are today operational. Designed in the 1960s the aircraft is starting to show its age and will gradually be replaced. The Swedish Air Force has selected the Grob G 120TP as its new Basic Trainer Aircraft, designated SK 40. Seven aircraft and one computer-based training system are on order, with delivery expected in 2022 and service starting in 2023.

Saab GlobalEye AEW&C 

Sweden will procure the Saab GlobalEye airborne early warning and control (AEW&C) platform to replace its two S100D/ASC890. The Swedish Armed Forces submitted an official request to the government to buy the Saab GlobalEye platform on October 1, 2021. On October 24, 2021 the Swedish government approved the purchase to replace its old S100D/ASC890.

On 30 June 2022 SAAB and the Swedish Defence Materiel Administration (FMV) signed a contract for the acquisition of 2 GlobalEye aircraft, to be designated S 106 in Swedish service. The deal is valued at 7,3 billion SEK (US$710 million) and deliveries are scheduled for 2027. The contract also includes the option to procure up to 2 additional GlobalEye aircraft.

Ranks

Commissioned officer ranks
The rank insignia of commissioned officers.

Other ranks
The rank insignia of non-commissioned officers and enlisted personnel.

See also
 Chief of Air Force (Sweden)
 Royal Swedish Academy of War Sciences
 List of air forces
 List of military aircraft of Sweden
 Swedish Air Force Museum
 Swedish Air Force Historic Flight

People
 Bengt Nordenskiöld
 Lars Olausson

References

Further reading
 Annerfalk, Anders. Flygvapnet: An Illustrated History of the Swedish Air Force (Ljungsbro: Aviatic Förlag, 1999).
 Åselius, Gunnar. "Swedish strategic culture after 1945." Cooperation and Conflict 40.1 (2005): 25–44.
 Böhme, Klaus-Richard. The Growth of the Swedish Aircraft Industry: 1918-1945: the Swedish Air Force and Aircraft Industry (Sunflower University Press, 1988).
 Green, William and Gordon Swanborough. "The End of the Beginning...The Seversky P-35". Air Enthusiast, No. 10, July–September 1979, pp. 8–21. 

 Silvester, John. "Call to Arms: The Percival Sea Prince and Pembroke". Air Enthusiast, No. 55, Autumn 1994, pp. 56–61. 
 Weibull, Alise. "The Swedish Armed Forces: Recent Developments and Future Strategy." in Giuseppe Caforio, ed., Cultural Differences between the Military and Parent Society in Democratic Countries (Emerald Group Publishing Limited, 2007) pp. 307–312.

External links

 Swedish Air Force – Official site
 Swedish Air Force Historical Flight, SwAFHF
 History of the Swedish Air Force 
 Information on Swedish military aviation
 Sunneberg – Information on Swedish aircraft 

 
Air Force
Military units and formations established in 1926
1926 establishments in Sweden